Leendert Antonie Donker (7 September 1899 in Almkerk – 4 February 1956 in Rotterdam) was a Dutch politician.

1899 births
1956 deaths
20th-century Dutch lawyers
Labour Party (Netherlands) politicians
Members of the House of Representatives (Netherlands)
Ministers of Justice of the Netherlands
People from Almkerk
Social Democratic Workers' Party (Netherlands) politicians
University of Amsterdam alumni